In enzymology, a sphingomyelin synthase is an enzyme that catalyzes the chemical reaction

a ceramide + a phosphatidylcholine  a sphingomyelin + a 1,2-diacyl-sn-glycerol

Thus, the two substrates of this enzyme are ceramide and phosphatidylcholine, whereas its two products are sphingomyelin and 1,2-diacyl-sn-glycerol.

This enzyme belongs to the family of transferases, specifically those transferring non-standard substituted phosphate groups.  The systematic name of this enzyme class is ceramide:phosphatidylcholine cholinephosphotransferase. Other names in common use include SM synthase, SMS1, and SMS2.

References

 
 
 
 
 

EC 2.7.8
Enzymes of unknown structure